Billy Charles Coody (born July 13, 1937) is an American professional golfer, best known for winning the 1971 Masters Tournament.

Coody was born in Stamford, Texas and raised in Abilene, Texas. He attended Abilene Christian University before transferring to and graduating in 1960 with a bachelor's degree in Business from Texas Christian University; he made his pro debut in 1963.

Coody won two regular PGA Tour events early in his career and was known as one of the best iron players of his era. However he was considered somewhat of an underachiever until his Masters victory. In the words of his contemporary Frank Beard, "Charlie's one of our better shotmakers but he tries hard not to win." Coody held the lead at the 1969 Masters Tournament with three holes left but finished bogey-bogey-bogey to tie for 5th place.

At the 1971 Masters Tournament, Coody opened with a 3 shot lead. He remained in the lead entering the final round but was expected to lose to co-leader Jack Nicklaus who had won the 1971 PGA Championship two months earlier. The event turned into a 3-way battle between Coody, Nicklaus, and a young Johnny Miller who was playing his first Masters as a professional. Miller took control with birdies on #11, #12, and #14 to build a two shot lead. However, things began to unravel when he hit his approach into the bunker on the 15th and failed to make birdie. He again hit his approach into the bunker on the 16th and made bogey. Coody, playing behind, made a customary birdie on the 15th and a clutch 15-foot putt on the 16th for another birdie. He made pars on the last two and won by two strokes. Nicklaus uncharacteristically played mediocre on Sunday. He had four three-putts for the round and shot 37 on the back nine without a birdie. He would tie Miller for runner-up.

Coody had his share of success after his Masters victory. He represented the United States for the only time in the 1971 Ryder Cup. He finished 5th at the 1971 Open Championship. He would win two events on the fledgling European Tour in 1973. He also had chances to win additional majors at the 1976 PGA Championship and 1977 PGA Championship. In 1976 he held a two stroke lead entering the final round before collapsing with a 77. The following year, at Pebble Beach, he finished two strokes out of a playoff, shooting a 73 in the final round. 

However, his Masters triumph did not serve as a catalyst for Coody to become one of the greats in the game. In fact, while he posted nine top-3 finishes through the 1970s and early 1980s, he never won on the PGA Tour again. Coody would play full-time on the PGA Tour until he reached his late 40s. 

When he turned 50, Coody played on the Senior PGA Tour with a decent amount of success, winning five times. Like most Masters winners, Coody played the Masters Tournament through his old age. He retired from active competition at the 2006 event having played 38 of the last 39 Masters.

Coody was inducted into the Texas Sports Hall of Fame in 2000. A college golf tournament, the Charles Coody West Texas Intercollegiate, is named for him. He also lends his name to a charity event, the Charles Coody Classic.

Coody's son Kyle was also a professional golfer in the 1980s and 1990s. Grandsons Pierceson and Parker turned pro in 2022.

Professional wins (15)

PGA Tour wins (3)

European Tour wins (2)

Other wins (1)
1971 World Series of Golf

Senior PGA Tour wins (5)

Senior PGA Tour playoff record (1–0)

Other senior wins (4)
1990 Liberty Mutual Legends of Golf (with Dale Douglass)
1994 Liberty Mutual Legends of Golf (with Dale Douglass)
1998 Liberty Mutual Legends of Golf (Legends Division with Dale Douglass)
1998 Liberty Mutual Legends of Golf (Legendary Division with Dale Douglass)

Major championships

Wins (1)

Results timeline

CUT = missed the halfway cut
"T" indicates a tie for a place.

Summary

Most consecutive cuts made – 14 (1966 U.S. Open – 1971 Open Championship)
Longest streak of top-10s – 2 (1968 PGA – 1969 Masters)

U.S. national team appearances
Professional
Ryder Cup: 1971 (winners)

References

External links

American male golfers
TCU Horned Frogs men's golfers
PGA Tour golfers
PGA Tour Champions golfers
Ryder Cup competitors for the United States
Winners of men's major golf championships
Golfers from Texas
Abilene Christian University alumni
People from Stamford, Texas
Sportspeople from Abilene, Texas
1937 births
Living people